WPCN (1010 AM) is a radio station broadcasting an oldies format. Licensed to Stevens Point, Wisconsin, United States, the station serves the Wausau-Stevens Point area. The station is  owned by Richard L. Muzzy, through licensee Muzzy Broadcast Group, LLC, and features programming from ABC News Radio.

Programming heard on WPCN includes a local morning show called Portage County Live. Former talk programming included the Glenn Beck Program, Neal Boortz, Scott Krueger (another local host), Clark Howard, and The Michael Savage Show. WPCN at one time was one of the only stations (perhaps the only station) to directly simulcast Fox News Channel. All FNC simulcasts were dropped by 2010.

History
Its original call letters were WTWT when it signed on in 1948 under the ownership and operation of the Bartell Group, a group of siblings from Wisconsin who were beginning the expansion of their family radio business.

The call letters changed to WSPT on January 1, 1951. For many years, WSPT broadcast a top 40 format. The station became WXYQ on October 12, 1977, and began airing a country music format as WXYQ, "10Q Country", dropping its simulcast with WSPT-FM. The station then became WSPO on May 30, 1988. On June 6, 1996, the station changed its call sign back to WSPT; on December 6, 2011, the station changed its call sign to the current WPCN.

In March 2013, WPCN transitioned to a full-time news/talk format and dropped Cumulus Media's True Oldies Channel programming on nights and weekends. The station now carries CBS Sports Radio programming on the weekends and talk shows at night, when its power is reduced to cover only Stevens Point proper to protect clear channel station CFRB in Toronto. Previously, the station used Dial Global's America's Best Music and Citadel's Timeless Favorites.

On November 9, 2016, WPCN changed formats from news/talk to oldies, branded as "True Oldies".

Previous logos

References

External links

PCN
Oldies radio stations in the United States
Radio stations established in 1948
1948 establishments in Wisconsin